Thompson Creek may refer to:

Thompson Creek (Chestatee River tributary), a stream in Georgia
Thompson Creek (Root River tributary), a stream in Minnesota
Thompson Creek (Oil Creek tributary), a stream in Crawford County, Pennsylvania
Thompson Creek (Ararat River tributary), a stream in Patrick County, Virginia
Thompson Creek (Nisqually River tributary), a stream in Washington
Thompson Creek (Skookumchuck River tributary), a stream in Washington
Thompson Creek (Santa Clara County, California)
Thompson Creek (Siskiyou County, California)

See also
Thompson River (disambiguation)